is a Japanese footballer currently playing as a right back for Ventforet Kofu as a designated special player.

Career statistics

Club
.

Notes

Honours

Club
Ventforet Kofu
 Emperor's Cup: 2022

References

External links

1998 births
Living people
Japanese footballers
Association football defenders
Hosei University alumni
J2 League players
Ventforet Kofu players
Sportspeople from Niigata Prefecture